The 1998–99 Serie A season was the 65th season of the Serie A, the top level of ice hockey in Italy. Nine teams participated in the league, and HC Meran won the championship by defeating HC Bozen in the final.

Regular season

Playoffs

External links
 Season on hockeyarchives.info

1998–99 in Italian ice hockey
Serie A (ice hockey) seasons
Italy